The Taming of the Shrew is a 1962 Australian television play, adapted by Alan Burke from the play by William Shakespeare. It stars Ron Haddrick and Brigid Lenihan.

The play was done live but it included some filmed sequences shot in Centennial Park.

Australian TV drama was relatively rare at the time.

Cast
Ron Haddrick as Petruchio
Brigid Lenihan as Katherina
Noel Brophy as a suitor	
Jon Ewing as a page
Judi Farr as the sister
Richard Meikle
Don Pascoe		
Alec Pucci
Charles Tasman
Malcolm Billings
Moya O'Sullivan
Donald Philips

Production
Alan Burke called the play "brilliantly theatrical. It plays like an express train and takes everyone with it." Burke said in adapting the play for television "I did a lot of work on the play - and fond that sub plots and prologue take up almost two thirds of the running time. We have trimmmed it back to about one third of the total length and the play now goes like a dream with the principals were strong and clear."

Geoffrey Wedlock did the sets. The costumes and decor were from the mid 17th century. It was Alan Burke's 14th play (he had also done 8 operas and musicals) and second Shakesepare adaptation on TV.

Reception
The Bulletin praised the acting.

The Sydney Morning Herald called it "a cheerfully handsome achievement."

References

External links
The Taming of the Shrew at IMDb

Australian television plays
Films directed by Alan Burke (director)